Dustin Poirier (born January 19, 1989) is an American professional mixed martial artist. He is a former Interim UFC Lightweight Champion. As of May 9, 2022, he is #2 in the UFC lightweight rankings and as of January 24, 2023, he is #12 in the UFC men's pound-for-pound rankings.

Early life and education
Poirier was born in Lafayette, Louisiana, and is of Acadian French descent, specifically of Cajun heritage. He attended Northside High School for a short time, as he dropped out in the ninth grade because of repeatedly getting into trouble and street fights.

Mixed martial arts career

Early career
Poirier turned professional in 2009, quickly compiled a record of 7–0, competing mostly in regional promotions across his native Louisiana and the Southern United States. Glimpses of Poirier's early MMA career in Louisiana is depicted in the documentary Fightville.

World Extreme Cagefighting
Poirier lost a unanimous decision to Danny Castillo in his WEC debut on August 18, 2010, at WEC 50.

Poirier defeated Zach Micklewright via first-round TKO on November 11, 2010, at WEC 52.

Ultimate Fighting Championship

2010
In October 2010, World Extreme Cagefighting merged with the Ultimate Fighting Championship. As part of the merger, all WEC fighters were transferred to the UFC.

After the UFC/WEC merger, newly crowned UFC Featherweight Champion José Aldo was set to make his first defense against No. 1 contender Josh Grispi at UFC 125. Aldo then had to withdraw from the bout due to a back injury on November 23, 2010. Poirier agreed to step in and face Grispi at the event on January 1, 2011. Poirier won the fight by unanimous decision.

2011
Poirier was expected to face Rani Yahya on June 11, 2011, at UFC 131. However, Yahya was forced from the bout with an injury, and he was replaced by promotional newcomer, Jason Young. Poirier defeated Young via unanimous decision after three rounds.

Poirier faced Pablo Garza on November 12, 2011, at UFC on Fox 1. Poirier defeated Garza via second round D'arce choke.

2012
Poirier was expected to face Erik Koch on February 4, 2012, at UFC 143. However, Koch pulled out of the bout, citing an injury, and he was replaced by Ricardo Lamas. Then, just two weeks later, Lamas had to withdraw from the fight with an injury, leaving Poirier again without an opponent. A week later, Max Holloway agreed to step in to fight Poirier. Poirier defeated Holloway in the first round, with a triangle-armbar from the mount position, earning a Submission of the Night bonus.

Poirier faced Chan Sung Jung on May 15, 2012, in the main event at UFC on Fuel TV: Korean Zombie vs. Poirier. This was the first time Poirier has been put on the main event. Jung defeated Poirier via submission (D'arce Choke) in the fourth round. The performance earned both participants Fight of the Night honors. The bout was honored as Fight of the Year by several publications at the conclusion of 2012.

Poirier defeated Jonathan Brookins on December 15, 2012, at The Ultimate Fighter 16 Finale via D'arce Choke.

2013
Poirier quickly returned to action, taking his second fight within 63 days as he stepped in as a replacement for an injured Dennis Siver. Poirier faced Cub Swanson in the co-main event on February 16, 2013, at UFC on Fuel TV: Barão vs. McDonald. During the fight, both fighters landed punches which appeared to hurt the other. Poirier scored leg kicks and double leg takedowns. Swanson retaliated with head kicks and submission attempts. Poirier lost the fight via unanimous decision (29-28, 30–27, 30–27).

Poirier faced Erik Koch on August 31, 2013, at UFC 164. Poirier hurt Koch with punches throughout the fight, knocking him down with a punch near the end of round 1 and nearly finishing the fight, he ended up winning the bout via unanimous decision. After the win, Poirier wanted a rematch with Cub Swanson. He told reporter Ariel Helwani that Swanson must "be a man".

Poirier faced Diego Brandão on December 28, 2013, at UFC 168. He won the fight via knockout in the first round.

2014
Poirier faced Akira Corassani at The Ultimate Fighter Nations Finale on April 16, 2014. He won the fight via TKO in the second round. The win also earned Poirier his second Fight of the Night bonus award.

Poirier faced Conor McGregor on September 27, 2014, at UFC 178. He lost the fight by TKO in the first round. This was the first time Poirier was stopped by strikes. After the match, Poirier said "I always saw it as a plus but the Conor McGregor fight was the turning point. I remember I was backstage getting ready to walk out and I saw him and he threw this smile and pointed at me. I don’t know why but it really got to me, man. It really messed with my head."

After the loss, Poirier transferred up a weight class to the Lightweight division. Poirier said that it was because weight cuts are distracting him from training. He also claimed that he would never go back to featherweight nor move up to welterweight. "This is the division (lightweight) I'm going to win the belt at," said Poirier in an interview.

2015
Poirier faced Carlos Diego Ferreira in a lightweight bout on April 4, 2015, at UFC Fight Night 63. He won the fight via knockout in the first round. The win also earned Poirier his first Performance of the Night bonus award and a disclosed pay of $118,000, the highest disclosed pay received by Poirier at the time.

Poirier faced Yancy Medeiros on June 6, 2015, at UFC Fight Night 68. He won the fight via TKO in the first round, after dropping Medeiros twice with punches. The win also earned Poirier his second Performance of the Night bonus award.

2016
Poirier was expected to face Joseph Duffy on October 24, 2015, at UFC Fight Night 76. However, Duffy pulled out of the fight on October 21, three days prior to the event, after sustaining a concussion during a sparring session. In turn, the pairing was rescheduled and took place on January 2, 2016, at UFC 195. Poirier won the fight by unanimous decision. After the bout, Poirier was hospitalized for a broken nose. He had a lay off for six weeks due to the injury.

Poirier next faced Bobby Green on June 4, 2016, at UFC 199. He won the fight via knockout in the first round. Poirier received a disclosed pay of $110,000, the second highest disclosed pay received by Poirier in his career at that point.

Poirier faced Michael Johnson in his second main-event bout on September 17, 2016, at UFC Fight Night 94. Poirier lost the fight via first-round knockout.

2017
Poirier challenged Jim Miller on February 11, 2017, at UFC 208. Poirier punched Miller against the fence, which appeared to hurt Miller. In return, Miller repeatedly kicked Poirier's legs. Later on, Miller swept Poirier onto the mat and failed a kimura attempt. Poirier won the back-and-forth fight via majority decision. The win also earned Poirier $50,000 and his third Fight of the Night bonus award. Due to injuries sustained during the fight, Poirier was suspended indefinitely.

After the suspension, Poirier fought Eddie Alvarez on May 13, 2017, at UFC 211. Poirier rocked Alvarez in the second round but was subsequently dropped when Alvarez landed two illegal knees while Poirier was against the fence. With the Texas commission not operating under the new unified rules, referee Herb Dean declared the fight a No Contest as he did not believe Alvarez knew Poirier was a grounded opponent at the time.

Poirier faced Anthony Pettis on November 11, 2017, at UFC Fight Night 120. He won the fight via TKO after Pettis tapped out due to a broken rib when Poirier applied a body triangle in the third round. This fight also won him the Fight of the Night bonus award.

2018
After the Pettis fight, Poirier signed a new contract with UFC although he had three fights remaining in his previous contract. Poirier faced Justin Gaethje on April 14, 2018, at UFC on Fox 29. He won the fight via TKO in the fourth round. This fight earned him the Fight of the Night bonus award.

Poirier faced Eddie Alvarez in a rematch on July 28, 2018, in the main event at UFC on Fox 30. He won the fight via TKO in the second round. This win earned him the Performance of the Night award.

On August 3, 2018, it was announced that Poirier had agreed to fight Nate Diaz on November 3, 2018, in Madison Square Garden. The bout was expected to be the co-headliner of UFC 230. However, on October 10, 2018, it was announced that Poirier pulled out due to a hip injury and as a result the bout was cancelled.

2019

Poirier faced UFC Featherweight Champion Max Holloway for the Interim UFC Lightweight Championship on April 13, 2019, at UFC 236. He won the back-and-forth fight by unanimous decision to earn the title and breaking Holloway's thirteen fight win-streak. This fight earned him the Fight of the Night award, his fourth consecutive performance bonus.

Poirier faced the undefeated and undisputed UFC Lightweight Champion Khabib Nurmagomedov on September 7, 2019, in a title unification bout at UFC 242. He lost the bout via rear-naked choke submission in the third round.

2020
Poirier faced Dan Hooker on June 27, 2020, at UFC on ESPN: Poirier vs. Hooker. He won the exciting back-and-forth fight by unanimous decision. This fight earned him his seventh Fight of the Night award. The bout was widely considered one of the greatest fights of the year and was a contender for multiple awards.

2021
As the first bout of his new contract, Poirier faced Conor McGregor in a rematch of their 2014 bout at UFC 257 on January 24, 2021. He won the fight via technical knockout in the second round, becoming the first person to defeat McGregor by knockout in an MMA bout. This win earned him the Performance of the Night  award.

Poirier faced McGregor for the third time on July 10, 2021, at UFC 264. Poirier won the fight in round one via technical knockout after the ringside doctor stopped the bout due to McGregor suffering a broken tibia, rendering him unable to continue.

Poirier faced Charles Oliveira for the UFC Lightweight Championship on December 11, 2021 at UFC 269. He lost the fight via a standing rear-naked choke submission in the third round.

2022
Poirier faced Michael Chandler on November 12, 2022, at UFC 281. He won the fight via a rear-naked choke submission in the third round. This fight earned him the Fight of the Night award.

Training
Poirier used to train at Gladiators Academy under retired MMA fighter Tim Credeur. After his loss to Chan Sung Jung, Poirier moved to American Top Team. His coach is Phil Daru.

Fighting style
Poirier holds a black belt in Brazilian Jiu-jitsu under Tim Credeur, but mostly finished his opponents through his proficiency in the striking arts since the early days of his career in the UFC. His boxing skills are lauded, and he has showcased them in significant victories over elite-level strikers such as Justin Gaethje, Eddie Alvarez, Dan Hooker, Max Holloway, and Conor McGregor. He is noted for his shifting punching style and extensive use of the shoulder roll.

Charity

Poirier auctioned his UFC 211 kit on eBay to raise money for Second Harvest Food Bank. The highest bidder paid $5,100 for Poirier's shirt, gloves, cap, hand wraps and shorts.
In April 2018, Poirier and his wife founded the Good Fight Foundation. Poirier proceeded to auction his UFC Fight Night 120 and UFC on Fox 29 fight kits as well. The money raised went to the family of a deceased Lafayette police officer and the Acadiana Outreach Center, respectively. Poirier also auctioned his UFC on FOX fight kit and used the money raised to buy 500 backpacks for school children in his hometown of Lafayette.

After his bout with Nurmagomedov at UFC 242, the two swapped shirts after the fight. In his post-fight interview, Nurmagomedov said that he would be selling the shirt Poirier gave him and donating the proceeds to Poirier's charity. Likewise, Poirier announced that he would be auctioning off his UFC 242 fighting equipment to raise funds for the foundation. After the event, Poirier auctioned his fight kit with Nurmagomedov's walkout shirt for $60,200. Simultaneously, Nurmagomedov sold Poirier's walkout shirt for $100,000 which was matched by Dana White for a combined total of a $200,000 donation to Poirier's foundation. According to Poirier, his foundation is working with Justin Wren's Fight for the Forgotten to help provide clean drinking water to the Echuya Batwa people in Uganda.

Poirier was set to face Garry Tonon in a grappling match at SubStars event on February 21, 2020, from which Poirier was supposed to be donating his ticket and PPV sales and part of his purse to his foundation. However, Tonon suffered an injury a week before the match and the bout was canceled.

During the COVID-19 pandemic, Poirier's foundation donated 1,000 meals to the employees of three major hospitals in his native Lafayette area.

On June 26, 2020, Poirier was awarded the Forrest Griffin Community Award by UFC for his charity work.

In recognition of Poirier's charitable contributions, Lafayette Mayor-President Josh Guillory declared March 15, 2021 Dustin Poirier Day in Lafayette, Louisiana and awarded Poirier a key to the city.

While still in the octagon immediately after his loss to Charles Oliveira, Poirier pledged twenty-thousand dollars ($20,000) to a charity of Oliveira's choosing in Oliveira's native Brazil, with the money eventually going to the Charles Oliveira Institute, which teaches martial arts for free to kids in Guaruja, Brazil.

After UFC 257, McGregor was scheduled to donate $500,000 to the Good Fight Foundation as he had pledged before their scheduled bout. As of April 12, 2021, Dustin Poirier states the donation had not been made. The dispute has been a source of controversy in sports media.

Business ventures

Poirier's Louisiana Style Hot Sauce 
On December 8, 2020, Poirier announced on Twitter the release of his brand new Cajun hot sauce brand 'Poirier's Louisiana Style' in collaboration with a Canadian company, Heartbeat Hot Sauce Co.In July 2021 a special 'Heatonist K.O.' edition was also released.

Rare Stash 
On January 5, 2022, Poirier announced via Twitter the release of his bourbon 'Rare Stash'.

Personal life

Poirier still spends most of his time in Lafayette with his wife and their daughter, but trains at American Top Team in South Florida, where he relocates before fights. The couple had their first child in 2016.

Poirier got his first tattoo at the age of 14. Currently, his chest and arms are covered in tattoos, including one on his chest that reads 武士道 (bushidō), which means "the way of warriors" in Japanese.

Filmography

Films

Video games

Championships and accomplishments
 Ultimate Fighting Championship
 Interim UFC Lightweight Championship (One time)
 Fight of the Night (Eight times) 
 Submission of the Night (One time)  vs. Max Holloway
 Performance of the Night (Four times)  vs. Carlos Diego Ferreira, Yancy Medeiros, Eddie Alvarez, and Conor McGregor
Forrest Griffin Community Award (2020)
 Tied (Nate Diaz, Edson Barboza & Frankie Edgar) for most Fight of the Night bonuses in UFC history (8)
 Tied (Drew Dober) for most knockouts in UFC Lightweight division history (8)
 Tied (Charles Oliveira, Rafael dos Anjos & Jon Jones) for fifth most wins in UFC history (21)
 Tied (Anderson Silva & Matt Brown) for fourth most finishes in UFC history (14)
 Tied (Jim Miller) for sixth most post-fight night bonuses in UFC history (13)
 MMAJunkie.com
 2014 April Fight of the Month vs. Akira Corassani
 2020 June Fight of the Month vs. Dan Hooker
 2021 January Fight of the Month vs. Conor McGregor
 2022 November Fight of the Month vs. Michael Chandler
 Fight of the Year (2018) vs. Justin Gaethje
 MMAWeekly.com
 Fight of the Year (2018) vs. Justin Gaethje
 MMA Fighting
 Fight of the Year (2018) vs. Justin Gaethje
 Wrestling Observer Newsletter
 Fight of the Year (2012) vs. Jung Chan-Sung on May 15
 Fight of the Year (2018) vs. Justin Gaethje on April 14

Mixed martial arts record

|-
|Win
|align=center|29–7 (1)
|Michael Chandler
| Submission (rear-naked choke)
|UFC 281
| 
|align=center|3
|align=center|2:00
|New York City, New York, United States
|
|-
|Loss
|align=center|28–7 (1)
|Charles Oliveira
|Submission (rear-naked choke)
|UFC 269
|
|align=center|3
|align=center|1:02
|Las Vegas, Nevada, United States
|
|-
|Win
|align=center|28–6 (1)
|Conor McGregor
|TKO (doctor stoppage)  
|UFC 264
|
|align=center|1
|align=center|5:00
|Las Vegas, Nevada, United States
|
|-
|Win
|align=center|27–6 (1)
|Conor McGregor
|TKO (punches) 
|UFC 257 
|
|align=center|2
|align=center|2:32
|Abu Dhabi, United Arab Emirates
|
|-
|Win
|align=center|26–6 (1)
|Dan Hooker
|Decision (unanimous)
|UFC on ESPN: Poirier vs. Hooker
|
|align=center|5
|align=center|5:00
|Las Vegas, Nevada, United States
|
|-
|Loss
|align=center|25–6 (1)
|Khabib Nurmagomedov
|Submission (rear-naked choke)
|UFC 242
|
|align=center|3
|align=center|2:06
|Abu Dhabi, United Arab Emirates
|
|-
|Win
|align=center|25–5 (1)
|Max Holloway
|Decision (unanimous)
|UFC 236
|
|align=center|5
|align=center|5:00
|Atlanta, Georgia, United States
|
|-
|Win
|align=center|24–5 (1)
|Eddie Alvarez
|TKO (punches)
|UFC on Fox: Alvarez vs. Poirier 2
|
|align=center|2
|align=center|4:05
|Calgary, Alberta, Canada
|
|-
|Win
|align=center|23–5 (1)
|Justin Gaethje
|TKO (punches)
|UFC on Fox: Poirier vs. Gaethje
|
|align=center|4
|align=center|0:33
|Glendale, Arizona, United States
|
|-
|Win
|align=center| 22–5 (1)
|Anthony Pettis
|Submission (body triangle)
|UFC Fight Night: Poirier vs. Pettis
|
|align=center|3
|align=center|2:08
|Norfolk, Virginia, United States
|
|-
|NC
|align=center|21–5 (1)
|Eddie Alvarez
|NC (illegal knees)
|UFC 211
|
|align=center|2
|align=center|4:12
|Dallas, Texas, United States
|
|-
|Win
|align=center|21–5
|Jim Miller
|Decision (majority)
|UFC 208
|
|align=center|3
|align=center|5:00
|Brooklyn, New York, United States
|
|-
|Loss
|align=center|20–5
|Michael Johnson
|KO (punches) 
|UFC Fight Night: Poirier vs. Johnson
|
|align=center|1
|align=center|1:35
|Hidalgo, Texas, United States
|
|-
|Win
|align=center|20–4
|Bobby Green
|KO (punches)
|UFC 199
|
|align=center|1
|align=center|2:53
|Inglewood, California, United States
|
|-
|Win
|align=center|19–4
|Joseph Duffy
|Decision (unanimous)
|UFC 195
|
|align=center|3
|align=center|5:00
|Las Vegas, Nevada, United States
|
|-
|Win
|align=center|18–4
|Yancy Medeiros
|TKO (punches)
|UFC Fight Night: Boetsch vs. Henderson
|
|align=center|1
|align=center|2:38
|New Orleans, Louisiana, United States
|
|-
|Win
|align=center|17–4
|Carlos Diego Ferreira
|KO (punches)
|UFC Fight Night: Mendes vs. Lamas
|
|align=center|1
|align=center|3:45
|Fairfax, Virginia, United States
|
|-
|Loss
|align=center| 16–4
|Conor McGregor
|TKO (punches)
|UFC 178
|
|align=center| 1
|align=center| 1:46
|Las Vegas, Nevada, United States
|
|-
|Win
|align=center| 16–3
|Akira Corassani
|TKO (punches)
|The Ultimate Fighter Nations Finale: Bisping vs. Kennedy
|
|align=center| 2
|align=center| 0:42
|Quebec City, Quebec, Canada
|
|-
|Win
|align=center| 15–3
|Diego Brandão
|KO (punches)
|UFC 168
|
|align=center| 1
|align=center| 4:54
|Las Vegas, Nevada, United States
|
|-
|Win
|align=center| 14–3
|Erik Koch
|Decision (unanimous)
|UFC 164
|
|align=center| 3
|align=center| 5:00
|Milwaukee, Wisconsin, United States
|
|-
|Loss
|align=center| 13–3
|Cub Swanson
|Decision (unanimous)
|UFC on Fuel TV: Barão vs. McDonald
|
|align=center| 3
|align=center| 5:00
|London, England
|
|-
|Win
|align=center| 13–2
|Jonathan Brookins
|Submission (brabo choke)
|The Ultimate Fighter: Team Carwin vs. Team Nelson Finale
|
|align=center| 1
|align=center| 4:15
|Las Vegas, Nevada, United States
|
|-
|Loss
|align=center| 12–2
|Jung Chan-sung
|Technical Submission (brabo choke)
|UFC on Fuel TV: The Korean Zombie vs. Poirier
|
|align=center| 4
|align=center| 1:07
|Fairfax, Virginia, United States
|
|-
|Win
|align=center| 12–1
|Max Holloway
|Submission (triangle armbar)
|UFC 143
|
|align=center| 1
|align=center| 3:23
|Las Vegas, Nevada, United States
|
|-
|Win
|align=center| 11–1
|Pablo Garza
|Submission (brabo choke)
|UFC on Fox: Velasquez vs. dos Santos
|
|align=center| 2
|align=center| 1:32
|Anaheim, California, United States
|
|-
|Win
|align=center| 10–1
|Jason Young
|Decision (unanimous)
|UFC 131
|
|align=center| 3
|align=center| 5:00
|Vancouver, British Columbia, Canada
|
|-
|Win
|align=center| 9–1
|Josh Grispi
|Decision (unanimous)
|UFC 125
|
|align=center| 3
|align=center| 5:00
|Las Vegas, Nevada, United States
|
|-
|Win
|align=center| 8–1
|Zach Micklewright
|TKO (punches)
|WEC 52
|
|align=center| 1
|align=center| 0:53
|Las Vegas, Nevada, United States
|
|-
|Loss
|align=center| 7–1
|Danny Castillo
|Decision (unanimous)
|WEC 50
|
|align=center| 3
|align=center| 5:00
|Las Vegas, Nevada, United States
|
|-
|Win
|align=center| 7–0
|Derek Gauthier
|KO (punches)
|Ringside MMA
|
|align=center| 1
|align=center| 0:57
|Montreal, Quebec, Canada
|
|-
|Win
|align=center| 6–0
|Derrick Krantz
|Submission (armbar)
|USA MMA: Night of Champions 2
|
|align=center| 2
|align=center| 3:35
|Lafayette, Louisiana, United States
|
|-
|Win
|align=center| 5–0
|Ronny Lis
|Submission (armbar)
|USA MMA: Border War 2
|
|align=center| 1
|align=center| 0:51
|Lake Charles, Louisiana, United States
|
|-
|Win
|align=center| 4–0
| Daniel Watts
|KO (punches)
|Bang FC
|
|align=center| 1
|align=center| 1:26
|Greenville, Mississippi, United States
|
|-
| Win
|align=center| 3–0
|Joe Torrez
|TKO (punches)
|USA MMA 8: Natural Disaster 3
|
|align=center| 1
|align=center| 2:37
|New Iberia, Louisiana, United States
|
|-
|Win
|align=center| 2–0
|Nate Jolly
|Submission (armbar)
|Cajun FC
|
|align=center| 2
|align=center| 3:54
|New Iberia, Louisiana, United States
|
|-
|Win
|align=center| 1–0
|Aaron Suarez
|KO (punches)
|USA MMA 7: River City Rampage
|
|align=center| 1
|align=center| 1:19
|Shreveport, Louisiana, United States
|

Pay-per-view bouts

See also
List of current UFC fighters
List of male mixed martial artists

References

External links

Living people
American male mixed martial artists
Cajun sportspeople
American people of Acadian descent
American people of French descent
Featherweight mixed martial artists
Lightweight mixed martial artists
Mixed martial artists utilizing boxing
Mixed martial artists utilizing Brazilian jiu-jitsu
Mixed martial artists from Louisiana
Sportspeople from Lafayette, Louisiana
People awarded a black belt in Brazilian jiu-jitsu
American practitioners of Brazilian jiu-jitsu
Ultimate Fighting Championship champions
Ultimate Fighting Championship male fighters
1989 births